Peach Creek (San Jacinto River) is a river in Texas.

See also
List of rivers of Texas

References

Sources

USGS Geographic Names Information Service
USGS Hydrologic Unit Map - State of Texas (1974)

Rivers of Texas
Rivers of San Jacinto County, Texas